Wiley Randall Robertson (born October 6, 1962) is an American politician from Cataula, Georgia. He is a Republican member of the Georgia State Senate representing District 29, elected in 2018. Robertson is a retired law enforcement officer and attended Command College at Columbus State University and the FBI National Academy.

Robertson was a Law Enforcement Officer in the Muscogee County Sheriff's Office. In 2018, he was elected to the Georgia State Senate. He was reelected in the 2020 general elections.

Early life and education 
Robertson was born in Hamilton, Georgia to Bobby Ray and Elizabeth Cobb Robertson. He attended Cataula Elementary School, Harris County Junior High School, and Harris County High School. Robertson has four sisters.

Career 
Robertson was a Law Enforcement Officer before entering politics, and after over thirty years in law enforcement retired from the Muscogee County Sheriff’s Office in 2015.

In a 2000 internal investigation by the Muscogee County Sheriff's Office, then Lieutenant Robertson was found to have conducted himself in a way that was "unbecoming of an officer" and "immoral." The investigation stemmed from an extramarital affair with his sister in-law that found Robertson engaged in sexual activity. The investigation further found that Robertson was not on duty at the time the activities took place and nothing occurred within a department vehicle. Despite the internal affairs report, Robertson maintains that in his thirty years with the Muscogee County Sheriff's Office he has never been reprimanded as he was cleared of all accusations.

Political career 
Robertson was elected to the Georgia State Senate in 2018 after the seat was vacated by Josh McKoon. In 2020, Robertson qualified for re-election and was not challenged in either the Primary or General election.

"Safe Communities Act of 2021"
On February 11, 2021, Robertson introduced Senate Bill 171, the "Safe Communities Act of 2021," which increases penalties for certain offenses committed during an "unlawful assembly." Robertson introduced the legislation in response to the George Floyd protests and the 2021 United States Capitol attack. The original bill failed to receive a committee vote before Georgia's crossover day. On March 18, Robertson reintroduced the legislation through a committee substitute of another bill from the state house. The American Civil Liberties Union of Georgia said the bill "tramples on and makes a mockery of the First Amendment." Mazey Lynn Causey, a legislative advocate for the Georgia Association of Criminal Defense Attorneys, believes that it would allow immunity for motorists that run over a protester.

Personal life 
Robertson is married to Theresa Garcia Robertson; they have four children and four grandchildren. The family goes to and worships with the First Baptist Church in Columbus.

Electoral history

References



Republican Party Georgia (U.S. state) state senators
People from Harris County, Georgia
Living people
1962 births
21st-century American politicians